Johor Bahru East Coast Parkway or the stretch of roads that includes Jalan Bakar Batu, Jalan Pasir Pelangi and Jalan Stulang Baru (Johor state route J5) are the major roads located in Johor Bahru city, Johor, Malaysia.

List of junctions

Roads in Johor Bahru